Under the Whyte notation for the classification of steam locomotives, a 4-8-6 locomotive would have had four leading wheels, eight coupled driving wheels and six trailing wheels.

Other equivalent classifications are:
UIC classification: 2D3 (also known as German classification and Italian classification)
French classification: 243
Turkish classification: 49
Swiss classification: 4/9

This wheel arrangement was proposed by Lima Locomotive Works in 1949 as a continuation of their "Super Power" concept, essentially an expansion of the 4-8-4. A larger firebox similar to the ones on the 2-6-6-6 locomotives built by Lima would have been fitted, allowing for greater power at speed. Despite promotion by Lima, there is no firm evidence that an example of this type was ever built and no nickname was ever assigned to the arrangement. In 1949, few railroads were interested in new steam locomotives due to steady improvements in diesel-electric locomotives.

It is possible that CB&Q 4-8-4 5601 was experimentally equipped with a six-wheel trailing truck to allow use on branch lines with lighter rail, but the experiment was unsuccessful. Photographic evidence is said to have existed in the 1950s, but no photos are known to exist at present.

Despite there being no documented full size examples built, there have been some 4-8-6s built for model railroads.

Reference:
Bill Withuhn, "Did we scrap steam too soon?", in Trains, Vol. 34, No. 8, June 1974, pp. 36–47.

8,4-8-6